Eadred (923–955) was a king of England.

Eadred is also the given name of:
 Eadred (bishop) (died 1042), Bishop of Durham 
 Eadred Lulisc (fl. late 9th century), abbot of Carlisle
 Eadred Ætheling (died  1012), a son of King Æthelred the Unready